Charles Clark (May 24, 1811December 18, 1877) was the 24th governor of Mississippi from 1863 to 1865.

Early life and education
Clark was born in Cincinnati, Ohio, on May 24, 1811, and subsequently moved to Mississippi. He is the great-grandfather of Judge Charles Clark, who served on the United States Court of Appeals for the Fifth Circuit from 1969 to 1992 and was the chair of the United States Judicial Conference.

In the late 1830s and early 1840s, Clark, a lawyer, represented a settler in a dispute with some Choctaw Native Americans over land in the Mississippi Delta. The dispute led to a series of lawsuits before the Mississippi Supreme Court. The settler ultimately prevailed and gave Clark a large tract of land between Beulah, Mississippi and the Mississippi River as his legal fee. In the late 1840s, Clark formed a plantation on the land, naming it Doe-Roe, pseudonyms commonly used in the legal profession to represent unnamed or unknown litigants (e.g., John Doe, Roe v. Wade). However, because of poor local literacy, the plantation became known by its phonic representation, Doro. It was prominent in the social, political and economic affairs of Bolivar County." He was also active in state politics, being elected as a member of the Mississippi House of Representatives several times.

Military service
During the Mexican–American War, he served as a colonel of the 2nd Mississippi Regiment of Volunteers. Following the secession of Mississippi in early 1861, Clark was appointed as a brigadier general in the First Division, First Corps, a Mississippi Militia unit that later entered the Confederate States Army. He commanded the brigade at engagements in Kentucky and then a division under Leonidas Polk at the Battle of Shiloh, where he was slightly wounded. Clark led a division at the Battle of Baton Rouge, where he was severely wounded and captured. He spent time as a prisoner of war before being released. He was promoted to major general of Mississippi State Troops in 1863.

Governor of Mississippi
On November 16, 1863, Clark was inaugurated as governor of Mississippi under Confederate auspices. He served in this capacity until June 13, 1865, when he was forcibly removed from office by occupation forces of the United States Army and replaced by William L. Sharkey, a respected judge and staunch Unionist who had been in total opposition to secession. Clark was briefly imprisoned at Fort Pulaski near Savannah, Georgia.

Clarke was ex officio President of the University of Mississippi Board of Trustees during his tenure as Governor of Mississippi. Despite losing the governorship, he remained on the Board for almost ten years after his term ended. In 1871, he purchased Routhland, an Antebellum mansion in Natchez, Mississippi.

Death
Clark died in Bolivar County, Mississippi, on December 18, 1877, and was buried at the family graveyard in that county.

See also
 List of Confederate generals
 List of governors of Mississippi
 List of heads of government who were later imprisoned

References

Further reading
 Eicher, John H., and David J. Eicher, Civil War High Commands. Stanford: Stanford University Press, 2001. .
 Sifakis, Stewart. Who Was Who in the Civil War. New York: Facts On File, 1988. .
 Warner, Ezra J. Generals in Gray: Lives of the Confederate Commanders. Baton Rouge: Louisiana State University Press, 1959. .

External links

 
 Charles Clark at The Political Graveyard
 

1811 births
1877 deaths
19th-century American lawyers
19th-century American politicians
Methodists from Mississippi
American military personnel of the Mexican–American War
American politicians with disabilities
Confederate States Army brigadier generals
Confederate States of America state governors
Confederate militia generals
Democratic Party governors of Mississippi
Heads of government who were later imprisoned
Democratic Party members of the Mississippi House of Representatives
Military personnel from Mississippi
Mississippi lawyers
Northern-born Confederates
People from Bolivar County, Mississippi
People from Cincinnati
People of Mississippi in the American Civil War
Politicians from Natchez, Mississippi
Prisoners of war held by the United States
Recipients of American presidential pardons
Augusta College (Kentucky) alumni